The Men competition at the IBSF World Championships 2020 was held on 27 and 28 February 2020.

Results
The first two runs were held on 27 February at 10:00. The last two runs were held on 28 February at 13:04.

References

Men